Madren Elbern "John" Calvert (August 5, 1911 – September 27, 2013) was an American magician and film actor. He performed on stage (including Broadway) for eight decades both in the United States and worldwide. Siegfried & Roy cited him as an inspiration, and Bess Houdini said that he was second only to Harry Houdini in "play(ing) the part of a magician."

He was also an actor who appeared in numerous movies and was the subject of a biographical documentary entitled John Calvert – His Magic and Adventures. The Society of Young Magicians (S.Y.M.) Assembly #29 of the Boston area is named after John Calvert.

Early years
Calvert was born in New Trenton, Indiana and became fascinated with magic at age eight when his father took him to see the magician Howard Thurston perform in Cincinnati, Ohio. Shortly afterward, he performed his first trick for his Sunday school class - he made an egg appear from under another boy's coat.

He made his initial magic tour when he was eighteen, performing in town halls in Kentucky backroad towns. His small troupe consisted of one assistant and "Gyp the Wonder Dog". He returned home with a $2.65 profit.

Depression era to the mid 1940s
During the Great Depression and into the 1940s, he continually increased the size of his magic show, adding illusions and personnel. He gained notoriety by performing daredevil stunts for publicity.

Acting career
From the mid-1940s through the late 1950s, he performed in approximately forty films, including starring roles in three Film Classic releases, in which he portrayed a debonair detective known as "The Falcon". He also played as himself in a Singaporean Malay movie in 1971, Mat Magic.

Fifties-present
Calvert continued performing magic during his Hollywood days. In the mid-1940s, he transported his show's equipment and personnel worldwide in a Douglas DC-3 airliner, and in later years on yachts.

Awards and accolades
In 2007, IBM Ring 257 named him Magician of the Year.

His biographer, William V. Rauscher, has called Calvert a "real-life Indiana Jones" because of his reputation for surviving dangerous circumstances in his travels. Even at age 100, Calvert traveled extensively, lecturing and performing magic.

Calvert was invited to perform his magic act both on Broadway in New York City and at the London Palladium Theatre on his 100th birthday.

Personal life
Calvert married his wife Tammy in 1982. He died on September 27, 2013, aged 102, in Bowling Green, Kentucky.

Filmography

References

External links

 Photographs of Calvert, plus one poster 
 Official website

1911 births
2013 deaths
People from Franklin County, Indiana
Male actors from Indiana
American magicians
American centenarians
American male film actors
Men centenarians
Academy of Magical Arts Masters Fellowship winners